Wam is a village of Ziarat District in the Balochistan province of Pakistan.

The village was badly affected by the 2008 Ziarat earthquake, quake survivors were trying to shelter in the remains of their homes as temperatures plunged below zero.

References

Populated places in Ziarat District